Peter Sand (born 19 July 1972) is a Danish former professional footballer who is the fitness coach for the Danish Superliga side Randers FC.

Peter is the twin brother of Ebbe Sand. Opposition fans in Denmark would often chant "Du ligner Ebbe Sand" (You look like Ebbe Sand) when he was playing. Both brothers played at Brøndby IF, though Peter did not play any first team games for the club.

External links
AGF profile

1972 births
Living people
People from Hadsund
Danish men's footballers
Association football midfielders
Association football forwards
Danish Superliga players
Eliteserien players
Ølstykke FC players
FC Midtjylland players
Barnsley F.C. players
Stabæk Fotball players
SønderjyskE Fodbold players
Aarhus Gymnastikforening players
Danish twins
Twin sportspeople
Danish expatriate men's footballers
Expatriate footballers in England
Expatriate footballers in Norway
Danish expatriate sportspeople in England
Danish expatriate sportspeople in Norway
Sportspeople from the North Jutland Region